"Private Show" is a song by American hip hop recording artist T.I., released on February 24, 2015, through Grand Hustle and Columbia Records, as the third single from his ninth studio album Paperwork (2014). The song, which was produced by Shama "Sak Pase" Joseph and Ace Harris, features vocals from American singer Chris Brown.

Background
T.I. had previously collaborated with Chris Brown, on his 2010 single "Get Back Up". "Private Show" was sent to urban contemporary radio on February 24, 2015, as the third official single from Paperwork. On February 26, 2015, T.I. premiered the official single artwork on his Instagram and uploaded the official audio on YouTube.

Music video
A music video for the song was released on May 11, 2015. It was directed by Emil Nava. Professional dancer Maxine Hupy posted her own routine set to the song on YouTube several months previously, and appears in the official video. As of March 2021 the video had over 40 million views.

Track listing
Digital download
"Private Show" (featuring Chris Brown) [Explicit] – 4:20
"Private Show" (featuring Chris Brown) [Clean] – 4:20

Charts

References

External links 

 

2015 singles
2015 songs
T.I. songs
Chris Brown songs
Grand Hustle Records singles
Columbia Records singles
Songs written by T.I.
Song recordings produced by Shama Joseph
Songs written by Shama Joseph
Dirty rap songs
Songs written by Bun B
Songs written by Verse Simmonds